The Night of the Mary Kay Commandos is the seventh collection of the comic strip series Bloom County by Berkeley Breathed.  It was published in 1989.

It is preceded by Tales Too Ticklish to Tell and followed by Happy Trails!.

The book includes "smell-o-toons", intended to enhance the Mary Kay storyline.  At a pivotal point in the story, the reader is instructed to lift a flap and smell a scented strip.

Synopses of major storylines

 Opus is coerced into the role of 1988 Meadow Party vice-presidential candidate.  Presidential candidate Bill the Cat is still in an alcoholic coma.  The United Cocaine Smugglers, Pushers and Affiliate Scum offer a campaign contribution.  (p1, 8 strips)
 Binkley's father, a staunch Democrat, goes fetal with guilt for not believing that Jesse Jackson is presidential material.  Oliver's father is brought in to forgive him on behalf of blacks worldwide.  (p3, 5 strips)
 Milquetoast the Cockroach is introduced, heckling Opus during a stump speech.  The cockroach is also shown whispering subliminal messages to the characters as they sleep.  (p5, 7 strips)
 Steve Dallas informs his mother that his father has not been dead for fourteen years, as she assumed, but has actually been reading the sports page in the den.  The whole time, in which she married and divorced six other men, she had mistaken him for the dirty laundry.  (p8, 3 strips)
 Bill the Cat dates Cornelia Guest, prompting former lover Jeane Kirkpatrick to send him dead roses.  Upon receiving a machine gun as a campaign gift from the NRA, the distraught cat shoots up the neighborhood.  (p10, 9 strips)
 While intoxicated, presidential front-runner Spuds Mackenzie smashes his car into Mother Teresa's.  Further Spuds scandals are revealed, such as a paternity suit involving Benji.  Budweiser fires Spuds as mascot, replacing him with the Care Bears.  (p15, 6 strips)
 Opus starts smoking, in order to "taste the adventure".  He saddles up Rosebud and heads out to "flavor country".  Eventually, social disapproval leads him to quit.  (p23, 9 strips)
 Oliver competes with Stephen Hawking to discover a Grand Unification Theory.  (p26, 5 strips)
 The Supreme Court rules that "male only" clubs are unconstitutional, and thus Bloom County must introduce a female character.  Portnoy and Hodge-Podge protest, while Binkley's father, Steve Dallas, Opus, and Milquetoast dream of their ideal female.  Later, Spuds Mackenzie reveals that not only is he actually female, but so is some unnamed member of the Bloom County cast.  After some pandemonium, including accusations and self-inspections, the mystery female is found to be Rosebud the Basselope.  (p28, 29 strips)
 Ronald-Ann is introduced.  (p43, 2 strips)
 Opus is called before the Republican Un-American Tendencies Committee as a suspected "liberal".  The label sticks (literally), and Milo informs Opus that the Meadow Party has dropped him from the ticket, replacing him with an "ultraconservative right-wing nut" to compensate.  (p44, 10 strips)
 Ousted from politics, Opus tries farming.  After studying proper chewing-tobacco protocol, he grows "one-half bushel corn, two pounds chemically fattened tomaters, one yam", for a total loss of $37 million.  Disaster strikes the farm, but government subsidies come quickly.  (p48, 7 strips)
 The press discovers that Bill the Cat spent the Vietnam years serving in the Canadian National Moose Mounties.  (p52, 4 strips)
 Oliver extracts sweat from Bill the Cat in an attempt to invent a "revolutionary new underarm deodorant".  He discovers that the deodorant causes rapid hair growth, and successfully markets the product as "Dr. Oliver's Cat-Sweat Scalp Tonic".  But due to "ack"-ing side effects, the Surgeon General declares the tonic illegal.  Formerly ten cents per bottle, the newly controlled substance is now worth $25,000, and Milo, Opus, and Oliver find themselves with a smuggling operation.  Crime rates rise, prisons overflow, and gangs fight on Oliver's lawn.  Finally, Congress legalizes the tonic, and crime ceases immediately.  (p54, 27 strips)
 Opus reads that his mother is alive, and has been taken to a cosmetics lab.  Opus infiltrates the Mary Kay animal testing lab and witnesses the horrors of animal testing.  Before he can reunite with his mother, he is caught in a firefight between the Mary Kay Commandos ("Even their Uzis are pink!") and the Animal Liberation Guerrilla Front.  Opus is liberated to his natural habitat, a 7-Eleven ice machine.  According to the author, this sequence was at least partly responsible for Mary Kay's 1989 moratorium on animal testing.  (p68, 19 strips)
 In the run-up to election day, Albert Goldman publishes The Lives of Bill D. Cat: Vegisexual, Nazi, Liberal.  Bill's standing in the polls plummets, and the Meadow Party gets so desperate as to accept Walter Mondale's offer to join the ticket.  Despite Milos's increasingly unethical campaign tactics, Bill loses to George H. W. Bush. (p78, 18 strips)

Bloom County
Books by Berkeley Breathed
Little, Brown and Company books
1989 books